This article displays the rosters for the participating teams at the AfroBasket 2015. The player ages are as of August 30, 2015, which will be the final day of the tournament.

Group A

Tunisia 
Tunisia's final roster as announced in the official website.

Central African Republic 
Central African Republic announced its 20-man preliminary squad on June 26, 2015, through head coach Aubin-Thierry Goporo. However, William Kossangue, James Mays, and Maxime Zianveni later dropped out. Goporo said he would not pursue "players who do not want to play for their country." On July 30, 2015, Michael Mokongo was ruled out of the tournament due to a knee injury.

The final squad of the Central African Republic team for the AfroBasket 2015:

Nigeria 
On July 2, 2015, the Nigeria Basketball Federation (NBBF) announced that Will Voigt would be the head coach for Nigeria at the AfroBasket. Ayinla Johnson and Abdulrahaman Mohammed would serve as assistant coaches. The team announced its preliminary squad on July 22.

Uganda 
Head coach Mandy Juruni announced Uganda's final roster on August 5, 2015. Ivan Lumanyika, who played a key role in the team's qualification, was known as the most notable player to be cut from the squad. Juruni added four new players: Brandon Sebirumbi, Marial Dhal, Stanley Ocitti, and Joseph Ikong.

Group B

Angola 
Angola's final roster as announced in the official website.

Senegal

Morocco

Group C

Egypt 
Egypt's final roster as announced in the official website.

Cameroon 
Cameroon's final squad as shown in the official website of the competition.

Gabon 
On June 11, 2015, head coach Thierry Bouanga announced the 21-man preliminary roster for Gabon.

Mali

Group D

Algeria  
Algeria's final squad as shown in the official website of the competition.

Zimbabwe

Cape Verde 
Cape Verde's final squad as shown in the official FIBA website.

Ivory Coast

References

External links 
Official website

2015
squads